Samantha Who? is an American television sitcom that originally aired on ABC from October 15, 2007, to July 23, 2009. The series was created by Cecelia Ahern and Donald Todd, who also served as producers. Although highly rated during its first season, the sitcom lost momentum and viewers throughout its second season, and ABC canceled the show in May 2009 before the remaining seven episodes were burned off the 2008–09 TV schedule.

The series was produced by Brillstein Entertainment Partners and Touchstone Television partnered with ABC Studios and executive produced by Christina Applegate, Donald Todd, Peter Traugott, Bob Kushell, Alex Reid, and Marco Pennette.

Plot
The show centered on Samantha Newly (Christina Applegate), a 30-year-old vice president of a real estate firm who develops retrograde amnesia after a hit and run accident. After awakening, she progressively realizes to her dismay that she had been selfish and unlikable before her accident, and therefore sets out to make amends and become a better daughter to her somewhat dysfunctional parents, Howard (Kevin Dunn) and Regina (Jean Smart), a better friend to self-centered Andrea (Jennifer Esposito), and needy but well-meaning Dena (Melissa McCarthy), and a better on-again, off-again girlfriend to her roommate and ex-boyfriend, Todd (Barry Watson). Wryly observing her transformation from "Old Sam" to "New Sam" is Samantha's bemused doorman, Frank (Tim Russ).

Production history
Produced by ABC Studios, Donald Todd Productions, and Brillstein-Grey Television, the series was officially greenlit and given a thirteen-episode order on May 11, 2007.

The show was originally named Sam I Am until ABC renamed it Samantha Be Good due to conflicts with the estate of Dr. Seuss. TV Guide later reported that ABC had changed the title of the series once more to Samantha Who?. Early television promotions for the series, playing off of the concept of its lead character's amnesia, appeared without stating any specific title. The lack of stated title (with a question mark shown instead) was attributed in promotions to Applegate's character not remembering the name of the series.

The series premiered on October 15, 2007, at 9:30PM Eastern/8:30PM Central and moved to 9:00PM Eastern/8:00PM Central on Mondays on November 26, 2007.

On October 25, 2007, ABC ordered six additional scripts for Samantha Who?.

On October 30, 2007, ABC ordered a full season of 22 episodes for Samantha Who?. However, due to the 2007–2008 Writers Guild of America strike, only 15 episodes were produced for season one.

On February 11, 2008, ABC picked up Samantha Who? for the 2008–09 television season.

On October 31, 2008, ABC ordered seven more episodes of Samantha Who? bringing the total number of episodes for the show's second season to 20. The announcement came in advance of mandated budget cuts at ABC Studios, which produces the series.

The series, which was filmed in the single-camera format, went on hiatus during the 2008–2009 television season and returned in a new timeslot on Thursday, March 26, 2009, following In the Motherhood before being pulled.

On May 18, 2009, ABC announced that they would not be renewing Samantha Who? for a third season. ABC burned off the final episodes on Thursday nights at 8:00PM Eastern/7:00PM Central from June 25, 2009, until the finale on July 23, 2009 (with additional episodes airing Thursday, July 2 and Thursday, July 9 at 8:30PM Eastern/7:30PM Central).
 
Pop began rebroadcasting the series in September 2011.

Cast and characters

 Christina Applegate as Samantha "Sam" Newly
 Jennifer Esposito as Andrea Belladonna
 Kevin Dunn as Howard Newly
 Melissa McCarthy as Dena
 Tim Russ as Frank
 Barry Watson	as Todd Deepler
 Jean Smart as Regina Newly
 McKinley Freeman as Tony Dane

Episodes

U.S. television ratings

Standard ratings
In the following summary, "rating" is the percentage of all households with televisions that tuned to the show, and "share" is the percentage of all televisions in use at that time that are tuned in. "18–49" is the percentage of all adults aged 18–49 tuned into the show. "Viewers" are the number of viewers, in millions, watching at the time. "Rank"; how well the show did compared to other TV shows aired that week.

Unless otherwise cited, the overnight rating, share, 18–49 and viewing information come from Your Entertainment Now. The weekly ranks come from ABC Medianet.

† This episode started at 9:45PM, so the ratings are estimated and are the average of the 9:30 half-hour and the 10:00 half-hour.

For the first six episodes of Samantha Who?, the show held the title of highest rated sitcom, a title which was held consistently by Two and a Half Men for the previous two television seasons.
Samantha Who? was, for its first seven episodes, the highest rated sitcom which debuted during the 2007–2008 television season.
Without a strong lead-in (provided by Dancing with the Stars in its first season) and paired with another failing ABC comedy In the Motherhood, the ratings for Samantha Who? dropped to lows of around 4 million in its second season.

Seasonal ratings
Seasonal rankings (based on average total viewers per episode) of Samantha Who? on ABC:

Note: Each U.S. network television season starts in late September (sometimes in early October) and ends in late May, or occasionally early June, which coincides with the completion of May sweeps.

Ratings competition

Samantha Who? first aired against fellow freshmen show K-Ville on FOX. It also aired against Rules of Engagement on CBS, Heroes on NBC and The Game on The CW—each in their second season. This was for the first six episodes Samantha Who? aired at 9:30pm.

On November 26, 2007, Samantha Who? shifted to the 9pm timeslot.  Its competition shifted from The Game to Girlfriends on The CW and from Rules of Engagement to Two and a Half Men on CBS.  Sophomore sitcom Notes from the Underbelly assumed the 9:30pm position.

DVD releases

Walt Disney Studios Home Entertainment released the entire series on DVD in Region 1.  They also released season 1 on DVD in Region 2 & Region 4 (Australia).  Both seasons contain several special features including bloopers and deleted scenes.  The Region 1 releases have been discontinued and are out of print.

On February 9, 2012, it was announced that Lionsgate Home Entertainment had acquired the rights to the series and plan on re-releasing it.  Seasons 1 and 2 will be re-released on May 1, 2012.

Awards and nominations

Broadcast

In the United Kingdom the series was broadcast on E4 and Comedy Central.  The series aired in Ireland on TG4.  In New Zealand the series ran on TV 2, and in Australia the series aired on Seven Network and 7Two. The series later reran on Pop (TV channel) and currently reruns in Logo TV.

References

External links

http://insidetv.ew.com/2008/12/05/florence-hender/

2007 American television series debuts
2009 American television series endings
2000s American romantic comedy television series
2000s American single-camera sitcoms
American Broadcasting Company original programming
Fiction about amnesia
English-language television shows
Primetime Emmy Award-winning television series
Television series by ABC Studios
Television shows set in Illinois
Works by Cecilia Ahern